Majerhat metro station is an under construction metro station on Line 3 of Kolkata Metro. It is the terminal station of the first phase 1 of this line, from Joka to Majerhat. The line was sanctioned in India's railway budget of 2010–11, but due to various hurdles, construction was delayed and missed multiple deadlines. The most notable reason for delays was the Majerhat Bridge collapse in 2018.

Location 
Majerhat metro station is located in Alipore Mint Colony, Majerhat, Kolkata, India. It is situated over the Majerhat railway station and parallel to the Majerhat flyover. Taratala is the preceding station towards Joka and Mominpore is the following station towards Esplanade.

Station details 
It is an elevated metro station with two side platforms. It is being implemented by Rail Vikas Nigam Limited (RVNL). Since the  line was sanctioned by then Railway Minister Mamata Banerjee in the Railway budget of 2010–11, it faced several problems which delayed the project. Originally the contracts of the elevated stretch of the line was awarded to Simplex Infrastructures in 2011, although construction couldn't proceed due to land acquisition problems. The contract for construction of the station was re-awarded to Gammon India, in April 2012 by RVNL. In 2018, the adjacent rail over bridge (known as Majerhat Bridge) along the upcoming metro station collapsed, completely stalling the construction of the station as it ran into design, technical and legal challenges. Gammon pulled out of the project after the bridge collapsed. In August 2020, GPT Infraprojects won the bid for construction. Work started in December 2020, with clearance from India Government Mint, Ministry of Finance; which initially didn't allow any elevated structure within a kilometre radius of the mint.

The station will be 180 m long with twelve spans. The platform and concourse area will be  and  respectively. It will be catered by five escalators, two elevators and five staircases. It is the final station of the proposed phase 1 (Joka to Majerhat) of the line 3.

Connections 
Majerhat metro station will be connected to the Majerhat railway station of Kolkata Suburban Railway, thus facilitating transfers with Budge Budge Branch line and Circular line.

See also 
 Dum Dum metro station

References

External links 
 Official website of Metro Railway, Kolkata

Kolkata Metro stations